The Cabinet of Niger (officially referred to as the Council of Ministers of the Republic of Niger) is made up of the appointed heads of Niger's government Ministries.  Ministers are chosen from the elected members of the National Assembly of Niger.  According to the Constitution of 18 July 1999 (the Fifth Republic) the Prime Minister of Niger proposes the membership of the Council of Ministers, and the President of Niger appoints the Ministers, which is then authorized by the National Assembly.  The Council of ministers meets at the discretion of the President, advises him on policy, and carries out the policies he orders. The Council of Ministers is headed by the Prime Minister of Niger, who is put forward by the National Assembly, and accepted by the President. The Assembly may remove the Prime minister by a vote of no confidence.

Current government 
Ouhoumoudou Mahamadou's government was formed in 2021.

2004–2009
Following the 2004 parliamentary election, no single party had a majority in the National Assembly.  The MNSD-Nassara, with 47 of the 113 seats—as well as the Presidency—formed a coalition government headed by Prime Minister Hama Amadou.  To support this government, some seats in the Council of Ministers were held by other parties.  When Hama Amadou was forced from office in June 2007, much of the personnel in the Council changed, although the same parties were represented.  Minor changes were made in 2008, but in May 2009, in response to their parties' opposition to a proposed referendum to allow the President to seek a third term, the three members of RDP-Jama'a and ANDP-Zaman Lahiya were replaced with ministers drawn from the MNSD-Nassara. With the continued support of the CDS-Rahama, the MNSD  maintained a working majority of 67 seats in the 113 seat National Assembly.

On 28 May 2009, the President of Niger, Mamadou Tandja, dismissed the National Assembly over his plans to hold a constitutional referendum, but retained the Council of Ministers and government of the Prime Minister.  On 25 June, following a statement by Minister of Communication Ben Omar demanding the Constitutional Court of Niger rescind a ruling which stopped such a referendum, the CDS announced its final break with the MNSD government.  The party  withdrew from the government coalition and pulled its eight members from the Council of Ministers, including the Minister of Defense, the Minister of Health, and the Minister of Youth and Sport.  In a statement, the CDS demanded the President definitively submit to the Court's decision. On 29 June the government announced seven of the eight CDS ministers had resigned, with the CDS Minister of Defence,  Djida Hamadou, choosing to remain in the government.

See also
List of government ministers of Niger 2009

References

"Niger : President Mamadou Tandja approves new govt.", African Press Agency, June 9, 2007.
List of governments of Niger: January 2000 - April 2007, izf.net/AFP.  Retrieved 2009-02-16.

Council of Minister
Niger